Arif Onur Saylak (born 12 May 1977) is a Turkish actor, filmmaker and director. He was married for six years to Tuba Büyüküstün, with whom he has twin daughters.

Personal life
On 28 July 2011, Saylak married the Turkish actress Tuba Büyüküstün in Paris, France. In January 2012, his wife gave birth to twin girls, Maya and Toprak. The couple got divorced on 5 June 2017. From his subsequent relationship with Gözde Yılmaz, he has a son who was born in December 2020.

Filmography

Directed 

 Daha – 2017
 Şahsiyet – 2018
 Uysallar – 2022

TV series 
 Bizim Evin Halleri (2000)
 Aşk Buraya Uğramıyor (2003)
 Yabancı Damat (2004) – İhsan
 Ne Seninle Ne Sensiz (2005) – Batanay
 Hisarbuselik (2006) – Çetin
 Kod Adı (2006) – Erkan Karaca
 Kod Adı: Kaos (2007) – Erkan Karaca
 Asi (2007) – Tilki Ziya
 Nefes (2009) – Ateş
 Gönülçelen (2010–2011) – Levent
 Sensiz Olmaz (2011) – Aydın
 Ağır Roman Yeni Dünya (2012) – Janti Metin
 Hayat Ağacı  (2014) – Cengiz
 Hatırla Gönül (2015) – Tekin
 Vatanım Sensin (2016) – Tevfik
 Çarpışma (2018–2019) – Veli Cevher
 Çukur (2019) – Veli Cevher (guest appearance)
 Kuzgun (2019) – Ferman Koruoğlu
 Babil	(2020) – Egemen Kıvılcım

Movies 
 Mavi Dalga
 Sonbahar (2007) – Yusuf
 Güz Sancısı (2008) – The Man Blowing a Feather
 Denizden Gelen (2009) – Halil
 Rüzgarın Hatıraları (2015) – Aram

References

External links 
 Onur Saylak on IMDb

1977 births
Living people
Male actors from Ankara
Turkish male film actors
Turkish male television actors
Turkish film producers
Turkish film directors